HSPC may refer to :

 Hematopoietic stem and progenitor cell (more commonly HSC)
 hormone sensitive prostate cancer
 Hydrogenated soybean phosphatidylcholine
 Heat shock protein C (hspC)